RLWE may refer to:

 Regularized long-wave equation; see Benjamin–Bona–Mahony equation
 Ring learning with errors
 Radio Limerick Weekly Echo, popular radio station broadcasting in Limerick, Ireland in 1978-1979